The 7th Goodwood Trophy was a motor race, run to Formula One rules, held on 25 September 1954 at Goodwood Circuit, West Sussex. The race was run over 21 laps of the circuit and was won by British driver Stirling Moss in a Maserati 250F. Peter Collins was second in a Vanwall and Roy Salvadori third in a 250F.

Results

References

Goodwood
1954 in English sport
1954 in British motorsport